Raymond Anthony Black (born June 26, 1990) is an American professional baseball pitcher in the Milwaukee Brewers organization. He previously played in Major League Baseball (MLB) for the San Francisco Giants and Brewers.

Career

Amateur career
Black had Tommy John surgery during his senior year in high school. He recovered from the surgery and played college baseball at the University of Pittsburgh for the Panthers from 2009 to 2011. He appeared in 30 games with Pittsburgh, finishing with a 10.95 earned run average (ERA) with 41 strikeouts and 41 walks in 37 innings.

San Francisco Giants
Despite his college numbers, Black was drafted by the San Francisco Giants in the seventh round of the 2011 Major League Baseball draft. He signed with the Giants rather than return to Pittsburgh. He did not pitch in 2011 and before the 2012 season, Black suffered a torn labrum in his right shoulder. The injury would cause him to miss both 2012 and 2013 while he recovered. Black finally made his professional debut in 2014 with the Augusta GreenJackets and in August, he was promoted to the San Jose Giants. He finished the year with a 3.57 ERA and 71 strikeouts in  innings. After the season, the Giants assigned him to the Scottsdale Scorpions of the Arizona Fall League. In 2015, he pitched for the San Jose Giants where he was 2–1 with a 2.88 ERA and 1.52 WHIP in 25 innings, and in 2016, he played with the Richmond Flying Squirrels where he compiled a 1–4 record and 4.88 ERA in 31.1 innings pitched out of the bullpen. He spent most of 2017 rehabbing an elbow injury with his only action of the season being three rehab appearances in August. He began 2018 with Richmond and was called up to the majors for the first time on July 8, 2018.

Milwaukee Brewers
On July 31, 2019, the Giants traded Black and Drew Pomeranz to the Milwaukee Brewers for Mauricio Dubón. Between San Francisco and Milwaukee in 2019, Black pitched to a combined 5.06 ERA with 18 strikeouts in 16.0 innings across 17 appearances. Black began the 2020 season on the injured list with a shoulder strain, and spent most of the season on the IL. He was activated in September and managed to throw 3 innings of 1 run ball in 3 appearances. On March 30, 2021, Black was outrighted off of the Brewers 40-man roster.

References

External links

Pittsburgh Panthers bio

1990 births
Living people
Sportspeople from Wilkes-Barre, Pennsylvania
Baseball players from Pennsylvania
Major League Baseball pitchers
San Francisco Giants players
Milwaukee Brewers players
Pittsburgh Panthers baseball players
Augusta GreenJackets players
San Jose Giants players
Scottsdale Scorpions players
Richmond Flying Squirrels players
Arizona League Giants players
Sacramento River Cats players
San Antonio Missions players